{{Infobox officeholder
| name                = Camille Chamoun
| native_name         = 
| honorific-suffix    = OM, ONC
| image               = Camille chamoun.jpg
| imagesize           = 200px
| caption             = Camille Chamoun's Presidential portrait, 1952.
| office              = 2nd President of Lebanon
| term_start          = 23 September 1952
| term_end            = 22 September 1958
| primeminister       = Abdallah El-YafiKhaled ChehabSaeb SalamAbdallah El-YafiSami as-SolhRashid KaramiAbdallah El-YafiSami as-SolhKhalil al-Hibri 
| predecessor         = Bechara El Khoury
| successor           = Fuad Chehab
| office1             = Member of the Lebanese Parliament
| term_start1         = 1934
| term_end1           = 1952
| term_start2         = 1960
| term_end2           = 1964
| term_start3         = 1968
| term_end3           = 1987
| office4             = Leader of National Liberal Party
| term_start4         = 10 September 1958
| term_end4           = 1985
| predecessor4        = Post established
| successor4          = Dany Chamoun
| birth_date          = 
| birth_place         = Deir el Qamar, Ottoman Empire
| death_date          = 
| death_place         = Beirut, Lebanon
| party               = Constitutional Bloc National Liberal Party
| spouse              = 
| children            = Dany,Dory
| alma_mater          = Saint Joseph University
| blank1              = Religion 
| data1               = Eastern Catholic Church
}}Camille Nimr Chamoun' OM, ONC (Kamīl Sham'ūn; 3 April 1900 – 7 August 1987) was a Lebanese politician who served as President of Lebanon from 1952 to 1958. He was one of the country's main Christian leaders during most of the Lebanese Civil War (1975–1990).

Early years and education
Camille Nimr Chamoun was born at Deir al-Qamar on 3 April 1900 into a prominent Maronite family. He received a law degree from Saint Joseph University.

Career and activities
He was first elected to the Lebanese parliament in 1934, and was reelected in 1937 and 1943. A champion of independence from France, he was arrested on 11 November 1943 and was imprisoned in Rashaïa Castle, where he was held for eleven days, along with Bishara el-Khoury and Riad Al Solh, who were to become the first president and prime minister, respectively, of the new republic. Massive public protests led to their release on 22 November, which has since been celebrated as the Lebanese Independence Day.

Chamoun was re-elected to parliament, which was then called the National Assembly, in 1947 and 1951. He was frequently absent, however, as he served as ambassador to the United Kingdom from 1944 to 1946 and as ambassador to the United Nations thereafter. He was the minister of finance from December 1946 to June 1947.

Presidency
When President Bechara El Khoury was forced to resign because of corruption allegations in 1952, Chamoun was elected to replace him. 

During Chamoun's presidency, Lebanon experienced an economic boom, in particular in the construction, banking and tourism sectors. He implemented a 1954 law on the creation of joint-stock companies and a 1956 law on banking secrecy. According to Fawwaz Traboulsi, Chamoun concentrated power into his hands, blurring the limits of democracy and autocracy.

 Crisis of 1958 

Near the end of his term, Pan-Arabists and other groups backed by Gamal Abdel Nasser, with considerable support in Lebanon's Muslim (particularly Sunni) community attempted to overthrow Chamoun's government in June 1958 after Chamoun tried to seek another term as president against the constitution. The mood may have been itself indicative of the fact that nine prime ministers formed cabinets under the six years of Chamoun's presidency since Sunni politicians were not always able to justify their association with his politics to their constituencies and popular power base. That fact was evident in the pressures that faced the El-Bizri political base in Sidon, and the longstanding parliamentarian Dr. Nazih El-Bizri served as a cabinet minister during Chamoun's term. Facing unrest in the country, with its epicentre in Sidon at the start of the protests, Chamoun eventually appealed to the United States for help under the new Eisenhower Doctrine, and American Marines landed in Beirut. Moreover, Naim Moghabghab, a close friend and political ally, formed and led a military group to reinforce Chamoun's position. Many battles occurred, mainly in Beirut and in the Chouf district, where clashes between Naim Moghabghab and Kamal Jumblatt's men led to bloody fights. The revolt was squashed, but to appease Muslim anger, General Fuad Chehab, who claimed to be a Christian enjoying considerable popularity in the Muslim community, was elected to succeed Chamoun. The American diplomat Robert D. Murphy, who had been sent to Lebanon as personal representative of US President Dwight Eisenhower, played a significant role in allowing Chamoun to finish his term normally and Chehab to be elected according to the constitutional procedures.

Founding National Liberal Party
On his retirement from the presidency, Chamoun founded the National Liberal Party (al-Ahrar). As its leader, Chamoun was elected to the National Assembly again in 1960, much to the consternation of Chehab. He was defeated in 1964 because of changes to the boundaries of his electoral district, which he and his supporters protested as deliberate gerrymandering. He was re-elected to the National Assembly, however, in 1968, and again in 1972, Lebanon's last parliamentary election in his lifetime. After the election of 1968, the National Liberal Party held 11 seats out of 99, becoming the largest single party in the notoriously fractured National Assembly. It was the only political party to elect representatives from all of Lebanon's major religious confessions.

Civil War

In the 1970s and 1980s, Chamoun served in a variety of portfolios in the cabinet, including interior minister. That was during the Lebanese Civil War (1975–1990), in which Chamoun and his party participated through the party's militia, the Tigers (in Arabic, nimr'' means tiger). In the early stages of the war, he helped found the Lebanese Front, a coalition of mostly-Christian politicians and parties, whose united militia, dominated by the Kataeb Party, became known as the Lebanese Forces (LF). Chamoun was chairman of the Lebanese Front from 1976 to 1978. He was defense minister in the cabinet of Rashid Karami in 1976.

In a 1976 diplomatic cable from Beirut, special US envoy L. Dean Brown stated, "If I got nothing else from my meeting with Frangie, Chamoun and Gemayel, it is their clear, unequivocal and unmistakable belief that their principal hope for saving Christian necks is Syria. They sound like Assad is the latest incarnation of the Crusaders."

Though initially aligned with Syria and inviting the Syrian Army to intervene against the leftist Lebanese National Movement (LNM) and its Palestinian allies in 1976, Chamoun later gravitated towards opposition to the Syrians' presence. 

On March 12 1980, In Dora, Mount Lebanon, a remote-controlled bomb exploded near the car of Camille Chamoun. One bodyguard was killed while Chamoun, his driver, another bodyguard and a passerby suffered minor injuries. Another assassination attempt occurred again on January 7, 1987 which killed 6 people and wounded 40 others when 165 pounds of explosives was detonated as Chamoun passed through East Beirut in the morning.

In 1980, the NLP's Tigers militia was virtually destroyed by a surprise attack from Chamoun's Christian rival, Bashir Gemayel.  After Israel's invasion of Lebanon, Chamoun decided to enter a tactical cooperation with Israel to oppose what he considered a Syrian occupation.

Gemayel was elected to the presidency in August 1982, but was assassinated before taking office. Chamoun announced his candidacy, but withdrew one day before the election, after the United States endorsed Amine Gemayel.

Personal life and death
In 1930 he married Zelpha (or Zalfa) Tabet with whom he had two sons, Dany and Dory, both of whom became politicians in the NLP.

In 1984 Chamoun agreed to join the National Unity government as deputy prime minister, which he held until his death on 7 August 1987, at the age of 87. He died of a heart attack at Saint George's Hospital in Beirut. He spent his last months mostly in the care of his protégée Aida Yahchouchi and her husband, Joseph Wehbe. He is remembered as one of the main Christian nationalist leaders and one of the last significant figures of Lebanon's prewar generation of politicians whose political influence was eclipsed during the war by that of younger militia commanders.

References

External links

1900 births
1987 deaths
People from Chouf District
Lebanese Maronites
Saint Joseph University alumni
Presidents of Lebanon
Lebanese anti-communists
Lebanese nationalists
Defense ministers of Lebanon
Members of the Parliament of Lebanon
National Liberal Party (Lebanon) politicians
Ambassadors of Lebanon to the United Kingdom
Permanent Representatives of Lebanon to the United Nations
Lebanese Front politicians
Collars of the Order of Civil Merit
Articles containing video clips
Finance ministers of Lebanon
Interior ministers of Lebanon
Lebanese independence activists
Chamoun family
20th-century Lebanese politicians
Christian nationalists